Parish Priest: Father Michael McGivney and American Catholicism is a biography of Father Michael J. McGivney, founder of the Knights of Columbus. The book was authored by Douglas Brinkley and Julie M. Fenster and was published by William Morrow and Company in 2006.

References

External links
 Excerpt form Parish Priest
Presentation by Brinkley on Parish Priest, January 19, 2006, C-SPAN

2006 non-fiction books
American biographies
Knights of Columbus
William Morrow and Company books